Valley Plaza was a shopping center in North Hollywood, Los Angeles, one of the first in the San Fernando Valley, opened in 1951. In the mid-1950s it claimed to be the largest shopping center on the West Coast of the United States and the third-largest in the country. It was located along Laurel Canyon Boulevard from Oxnard to Vanowen, and west along Victory Boulevard. Like its competitor Panorama City Shopping Center to the north, Valley Plaza started with one core development and grew over time to market, under the single name "Valley Plaza", a collection of adjacent retail developments with multiple developers, owners, and opening dates.

Opening
The idea to develop the plaza came from developer Bob Symonds in 1942, who had helped to create the Miracle Mile concentration of shops on Wilshire Boulevard. from started with a  2-story Sears store announced in 1948. The center was on a 50-acre lot including 15 acres of parking.

The shopping center opened August 12, 1951, with parking for 4000 cars, and having cost between $20,000,000 and $40,000,000 (depending on the source) to build. The Sears opened September 12, 1951. Other early anchors were Thrifty Drug Stores, J. J. Newberry, Bond's, Gallenkamp Shoes, and multiple supermarkets: McDaniels, Alexander's and a combined Mayfair-Owl/Rexall supermarket-and-drugstore.

On January 22, 1954, the Occidental Savings Bank opened a branch designed by Stiles O. Clements, famous for the design of Streamline Moderne retail buildings on Miracle Mile, Coulter's and the Mullen & Bluett buildings, amongst many others.

Expansion
Valley Plaza would later extend along Victory Boulevard to cover .  By 1956 it claimed to cover 100 acres with 1,039,000 square feet of retail space, the third-largest in the nation at that time, after Cross County Shopping Center in Yonkers, New York and Northland Center in Greater Detroit. It claimed to have close to $100 million in annual sales. The Valley Plaza Merchants Associated counted the May Company department store at Oxnard St., as part of "Valley Plaza", but later, in 1968, May would build an enclosed mall, Laurel Plaza, attached to their store, thus forming a separate identity from Valley Plaza. The May Co. being very large, Valley Plaza claimed to have the second-largest suburban branch department store in the country, outsized only by a branch of Hudson's in suburban Detroit.

A J. C. Penney opened on the north side of Victory Blvd. bordering the Hollywood Freeway in early 1959. It was also around this time that the Hollywood Freeway was extended north to Magnolia Boulevard and the Ventura Freeway was completed nearby, greatly increasing the accessibility of the center. A Goodyear tire store also opened around this time.

In 1960 the Los Angeles Federal Savings and Loan Tower, now known as the Valley Plaza Tower, was completed. The building is now occupied by Wells Fargo Bank. It was upon opening, the tallest building in the San Fernando Valley. Architects were Douglas Honnold and John Rex and the style is "Corporate International". It was one of the first skyscrapers built in Los Angeles after the 1957 repeal of a 150-foot height limit ordinance. Murals that have adorned the full height and width of the western side of the tower over the decades. Today it portrays the history of Los Angeles; previous subjects were the 1976 United States Bicentennial, the 1984 Summer Olympics held in Los Angeles, and former football team of the city, the Los Angeles Raiders.

Decline
Reasons for the decline of Valley Plaza included:
The area became progressively lower in income, as working-class Hispanics replaced middle- and upper-class Whites as the suburbs expanded ever westward and northward. However, this allowed lower-end retail, such as the 99 Cent Only store and Smart & Final Extra!, to thrive in places like North Hollywood.
Competition - Valley Plaza competed with the large Panorama City Shopping Center from the same era, and from the 1960s onward, numerous other malls were built in the Valley such as Sherman Oaks Fashion Square. Later, the renovated Burbank Town Center and power centers, like Burbank Empire Center and The Plant in Panorama City, would compete.
Multiple owners - by 1999 the area marketed as Valley Plaza had dozens of owners, making it more difficult to formulate a strategy and react to the market
Other factors such as effects of the 1994 Northridge earthquake, perception of crime, and more.

From the original development on the west side of Laurel Canyon Boulevard, the current status is as follows:
 from Archwood south to Kittridge: site of McDaniels Market (6657 Laurel Canyon) is now a Ralphs, block is also home to 99 Cents Only Stores and Smart & Final Extra!
 from Kittridge south to Hamlin (original site of Mayfair-Rexall et al.) - now occupied by Roy Romer Middle School and ISANA Palmati Academy charter school
 from Hamlin south to Victory - the former Sears store, closed in 2019, is now home to a Burlington and a Ross Dress for Less. The strip of shops behind (west of) Sears, is mostly occupied.
 from Victory south to Sylvan - mostly abandoned storefronts
 from Sylvan south to Erwin - an operating Gold's Gym and various abandoned storefronts along Laurel Canyon and around the parking lot at the back

Along Victory Boulevard west of Laurel Canyon, the Penney's building at 12215 Victory is used by West Coast University as a campus. The Regal Cinemas closed as of December 2021. The McMahan's Furniture store at 12126 Victory Blvd. is now a DaVita dialysis center.

Further south along Laurel Canyon (Laurel Plaza and the May Co.), after the 1994 Northridge earthquake, the Laurel Plaza mall was closed due to damage but the department store May Co. remained open. It became a Robinsons-May in 1993, then Macy’s in 2006 which operated until 2016, after the property was sold for redevelopment.

After the earthquake, the renovation of Valley Plaza and Laurel Plaza area became a project of the Community Redevelopment Agency of the City of Los Angeles. Shortly after 2000, J. H. Snyder acquired the core Valley Plaza property from lender iStar, and announced plans for a $300 million renovation. Over the next 10 years, leases were not renewed and tenants were evicted, resulting in a mostly abandoned property. However Snyder was not able to follow through on the plans and sold it back to iStar in 2011. As of mid-2020, only the former May Co./Laurel Plaza site is under construction  as NoHo West, a mixed-use development including retail.

External links
"Valley Plaza" in "Retail California: Shopping Centers, Malls, and Creating a New Consumerism", Ryan Reft, KCET, April 4, 2013
"The Rise, Fall and Rebirth of Valley Plaza" (archived), Sirinya Tritipeskul for UCLA course "Urban Planning 253: Sprawl", Professor Randy Crane, Fall Quarter 2007
Craig Clough, "Video History of Valley and Laurel Plazas, Part 1: Empty, Forgotten, Abandoned", North Hollywood-Toluca Lake Patch (Web), May 12, 2011
Craig Clough, "Video History of Valley and Laurel Plazas, Part 1: Empty, Forgotten, Abandoned", North Hollywood-Toluca Lake Patch (YouTube)

References

Shopping malls in the San Fernando Valley
North Hollywood, Los Angeles
Shopping malls established in 1951
Abandoned shopping malls in the United States
1950s in Los Angeles